An international branch campus (IBC) is a form of international higher education whereby one or more partnering institutions establishes a physical presence in a foreign location for the purpose of expanding global outreach and student exchange. Generally named for their "home" institution and offering undergraduate and graduate programs, graduating students are conferred degrees from one or all partnering institutions, dependent on the agreement. Instruction most often occurs in properties owned or leased by the foreign institution, sometimes with a local partner, and may also include additional services and facilities to mirror Western universities. IBCs are delivered in many formats and currently exist all over the world. As a relatively new method of delivering post-secondary education, IBCs have been deemed successful and yet face continual criticism.

Background 

While the internationalization of higher education is considered a contemporary phenomenon, it has a variety of historical roots. During the colonial era, the practice of setting up "branch" institutions in foreign countries or sponsoring schools in the colonies was commonplace, serving the most basic purposes characteristic of the period. This practice continued into the nineteenth century by American Protestant missionaries, who established colleges grounded in the U.S. model in countries such as Egypt, Turkey and Lebanon, practices from which the American University of Beirut was founded. In a broader sense, higher education institutions have long held global orientations, in that they served international students, employed professors from different countries, and functioned chiefly in the common language of Latin.

Close resemblances of the contemporary branch campus model emerged in the early twentieth century. At this time, these campuses functioned primarily to serve U.S. military and civilian personnel in the U.S.-owned Canal Zone. Florida State University, among other institutions, began providing this type of cross-border program as early 1933. In the 1950s, Johns Hopkins University opened a branch campus in Italy which is now considered the oldest established branch campus still in operation. The first concentration of branch campuses in a single country was established in Japan during the 1980s for various diplomatic reasons.  Wanting to improve the relationship between Japan and the United States, the Japanese government recruited several U.S. universities to establish branch campuses on its soil, of which nearly 30 did in cooperation with Japanese institutions or private companies. Only one of these campuses (Temple University, Japan Campus) remain today; the rest mostly closing due to inconvenient locations and difficulties in English language instruction.

International branch campuses began to proliferate in the mid-1990s and further into the twenty-first century. The first non-American institution to establish a branch campus in the modern era was French Fashion University that opened in Norway in 1990. The rest of the 1990s saw a wave of diversifying institutions expanding abroad, primarily from Australia, Mexico, Chile, Ireland, Canada, Italy, the UK, and Sweden; to target areas in Africa, Southeast and East Asia, the Middle East and South America. There were approximately 50 IBCs at the end of the '90s boom (not including those in the Japanese bubble), reaching 183 in 2011. Some have seen the development of the IBCs an extraordinary form of privatization in the public sector (largely due to the geographic separation from the state); however, Jason E. Lane and Kevin Kinser have argued that the extent of an IBCs privatization should also be assessed in relation to fulfilling public purposes in the host country. As of 2015, there are 282 branch campuses worldwide. Not included in this figure are the range of for-profit providers, such as The Apollo Group through the University of Phoenix, who now has campuses in Mexico, India, Latin America and parts of Europe.

Globalization and higher education 
The growth of branch campuses and internationalizing activities in the 1990s can be largely attributed to the forces of globalization. Though there were plenty of opponents against the idea that higher education should be subject to the types of free-trade agreements that were applied toward commercial goods and services within the global economy, counterarguments offer the perspective that trade had already been present in higher education for some time, evidenced in the increasing numbers of students seeking education overseas. In fact, this trade was seen in many ways as a tool for international relations and soft power.

One development which was of particular significance to the globalization of education was the finalization of the Uruguay round of trade talks in 1995, from which the World Trade Organization (WTO), the body that monitors and promotes free trade, was formed. The Uruguay round also saw the creation of new trade agreements, such as the General Agreement on Trade in Services (GATS) and Trade-Related Intellectual Property Rights (TRIPs). The significance of these trade agreements was that they expanded the notion of trading in goods to include trading in services.

Geographic locations 
Most international branch campuses are located throughout Asia and the Middle East. IBCs have developed in dense pockets in regions such as the United Arab Emirates, Qatar, Saudi Arabia, Singapore and Malaysia. Both the United Arab Emirates and Qatar have transformed themselves as educational hubs (a collection of campuses from multiple institutions in a common space, creating educational 'hubs', 'cities,' or 'parks'), with Saudi Arabia and Malaysia following closely behind. These academic reforms are mostly market-driven; approximately two-thirds of the new universities in the Arab Middle East are private and nearly half are branches of Western institutions, mostly from the United States, and others from Australia and the United Kingdom.

Many of the countries with the most IBCs (United Arab Emirates, Qatar, China, Malaysia and Singapore) have struggled with the problem of brain drain. The logic of hosting a foreign institution's branch campus is to prevent local students from actually studying abroad by luring them to stay by receiving a foreign degree at home and at a considerably lower cost. Hosting a foreign branch campus can also enhance links with industry, as in some cases programs offered at the campus are aligned by the government to reflect the nation's industry needs; in other cases, such as typically in the Arab Middle East, IBCs help expedite the process of transitioning from an oil economy to a knowledge economy.

Notable regions and institutions 
Nearly half of the IBCs in operation today are from American institutions, with Australia and the United Kingdom following closely behind. For many institutions, the establishment of a branch campus abroad is an opportunity to improve international relationships, ability to attract foreign talent, increase prestige and tuition revenue, and expand opportunities for external funding.

United Arab Emirates 

The UAE has set aggressive goals to make it a destination for higher education destination. Free zones have been established in individual Emirates in which organizations operating from within are exempt from federal regulation. These zones were originally intended for foreign investment from corporations and have expanded to house education hubs—or education cities. IBCs in free zones are generally financially independent and expected to cover their own costs. Fifty of these IBCs are located across four different free zones in Dubai, each operating as its own complex. Established by real estate master developer TECOM Investments in 2003 to complement other business parks, Dubai Knowledge Village (DKV) contains 15 IBCs and 150 training institutions and learning centers. DKV was expanded in 2007 to Dubai International Academic City (DIAC), which consists of 40 branch campuses of foreign universities. IBCs within the free zones are regulated by the Dubai Knowledge and Human Development Authority. There are a number of private institutions outside the UAE's free zones. The Commission for Academic Accreditation (CAA), the federal accrediting body modeled after agencies in the United States, regulates these institutions. Foreign education providers are expected to obey and maintain the policies and regulations of their home campus.

Qatar: Education City 

Qatar's Education City was developed to attract top programs, primarily from the United States in order to enhance the educational offerings in the country. While IBCs in Education City remain private institutions, the construction of Education City was funded through the royal family's Qatar Foundation for Education, Science and Community Development.  there are seven international universities (six American, one French) with programs available at IBCs in the Education City, in addition to one Qatari university. The curriculum is taught in English and features the traditional U.S. model of general education. Students can enroll in courses from multiple IBCs at one time. The eight institutions in Education City include:

Virginia Commonwealth University
Weill Cornell Medical College
Texas A&M
Carnegie Mellon
Georgetown University School of Foreign Service
Northwestern University
Hautes Etudes Commerciales de (HEC) Paris
Hamad Bin Khalifa University

Malaysia 
Development of international branch campuses in Malaysia reflects the country's pursuit of becoming a global knowledge hub. Two major IBC initiatives in Malaysia include EduCity in Iskandar and Kuala Lumpur Education City (KLEC). Built in an economic free-zone, EduCity is sponsored by the government-backed investment organization, Iskandar Investment Bhd (IIB), whose strategic goals include recruiting regional students, producing a skilled workforce that supports foreign companies in the free-zones of Iskandar. KLEC, which is located in the Klang Valley of Kuala Lumpur, is overseen by the private investment firm KLEC Ventures, which seeks to attract commercial investment to Malaysia and touts its environmentally friendly and energy efficient nature. These institutions exemplify Malaysia's recent shift from sending students abroad to receiving students from abroad.

Many of these foreign educational institutions in Malaysia are branch campuses. A branch can be seen as an 'offshore campus' of the foreign university, which offers identical courses and awards as the main campus. Local and international students can acquire these identical foreign qualifications in Malaysia at a lower fee, with a local Asian experience. Some of the foreign university branch campuses in Malaysia include:
 University of Nottingham Malaysia Campus
 Monash University Malaysia Campus
 RCSI & UCD Malaysia Campus
 Curtin University, Malaysia
 Swinburne University of Technology Sarawak Campus
 Newcastle University Medicine Malaysia (NUMed)
 University of Southampton, Malaysia 
 Heriot-Watt University Malaysia
 University of Reading Malaysia
 Xiamen University Malaysia
 SAE Institute, Australia
 Manipal International University
 Raffles Design Institute, Singapore
 Tsukuba University, Japan

India 
India has had a variety of efforts to allow for the importing of international branch campuses. The National Education Policy 2020 allowed for the importing and exporting of IBCs. The policy set an explicit goal of using IBCs as a means for advancing Prime Minister Narendra Modi's goal of positioning India as a Vishwa Guru (world teacher).

Research Productivity 
Most IBCs focus initially on providing education; however, some IBCs have evidenced interest and commitment to engaging in research. Hans Pohl and Jason E. Lane developed a methodology using SciVal data to determine the research productivity of faculty/researchers at IBCs. Their research demonstrated that IBCs in countries such as Qatar, UAE, and Malaysia contribute a significant portion of those nation's overall research productivity. However, in an analysis of research-producing universities in Abu Dhabi, their research suggested that IBCs may not necessarily have greater impact than other forms of educational investment when it comes to overall research productivity.

Cross-Border Education Research Team 
The Cross-Border Education Research Team (C-BERT) was founded in 2010 by Professors Jason Lane and Kevin Kinser, then at the State University of New York at Albany, to track and study the development of international branch campuses. C-BERT maintains the only publicly accessible list of IBCs operating around the world, which is important as the entities are disbursed across dozens of countries and often not tracked through other educational data collections. C-BERT's efforts to advance knowledge about international branch campuses has been recognized by the Association for the Study of Higher Education with their award for Outstanding Contributions to International Education Research.

Criticisms 
Though a variety of studies concerning the student experience and satisfaction in IBCs have found that most students react to their branch campuses similarly to their peers at the home institutions, criticism of IBCs abound. Most prominent among these concerns are those that relate to attracting and retaining host campus faculty, misalignment between home and branch campus, replicating diversity and quality of the student body, mirroring forms of cultural imperialism, lack of data to drive decision-making, organizational culture, and the ability of IBCs to adapt to the "new" local context.

References

External links 
 Branch campuses
 Rise of Education City Qatar

Campuses